Hamnam Line (咸南線, Kan'nan-sen) was the name given by the Chōsen Railway (Chōtetsu) of colonial-era Korea to a small network of  narrow gauge railway lines in South Hamgyeong Province.

History
A line from Hamheung on the Hamgyeong Line of the Chōsen Government Railway to Oro, to exploit forestry and other resources in the area, was originally planned by the Chosen Forestry Railway as part of a trunk line connecting Hamhung to Manpo via Changjin and Huju. The first section,  from Hamheung to Oro, was opened on 7 June 1923, and on 25 August 1923, the  Oro–Jangpung section and West Hamheung Station were opened.

On 1 September 1923, the Chōsen Forestry Railway merged with five other private railway companies to form the Chōsen Railway (Chōtetsu); Chōtetsu subsequently named the Hamheung–Jangpung line Hamnam Line.

On 1 October 1926, Chōtetsu opened a  section of line from Oro to Sangtong; this was followed on 1 February 1928 by the  section from Pungsang to Hamnam Songheung. Two years later, on 1 February 1930 the Hamnam Line was taken over by a newly established subsidiary company, the Sinheung Railway.

The Sinheung Railway continued to expand the network, and on 15 January 1932, after the existing Hamnam Songheung Station was renamed Hasonghung Station, the present Hamnam Songheung Station was opened  from Hasongheung,  and on 10 September 1933, the line was extended  to Bujeonhoban. 

The Sinheung Railway was absorbed by Chōtetsu on 22 April 1938, and Chōtetsu separated the Hamnam Sinheung–Bujeonhoban section from the Hamnam Line, naming that portion the Songheung Line.

After the establishment of North Korea and the nationalisation of its railways, the Hamnam Line was split up, with the Hamheung - Oro - Sinheung section becoming the Sinhŭng Line, and the Oro - Sangtong section becoming part of the Changjin Line. At the same time, the Songheung Line was merged into the Sinhŭng Line.

Services
In the November 1942 timetable, the last issued prior to the start of the Pacific War, Chōtetsu operated the following schedule of third-class-only local passenger services:

Route

References

Rail transport in North Korea
Rail transport in Korea
Korea under Japanese rule
Defunct railway companies of Japan
Defunct railway companies of Korea
Chosen Railway